Emmanuel Giménez (born 19 February 1984) is an Argentine footballer. His last club was Estudiantes de San Luis.

References
 
 

1984 births
Living people
Argentine footballers
Argentine expatriate footballers
Juventud Antoniana footballers
Atlético de Rafaela footballers
Talleres de Córdoba footballers
Club Atlético Temperley footballers
Gimnasia y Esgrima de Jujuy footballers
Estudiantes de Buenos Aires footballers
Club y Biblioteca Ramón Santamarina footballers
C.D. Antofagasta footballers
Chilean Primera División players
Expatriate footballers in Chile
Association football midfielders
Argentine expatriate sportspeople in Chile
Footballers from Córdoba, Argentina